Thomas Mario Haas (born 3 April 1978) is a German former professional tennis player. He competed on the ATP Tour from 1996 to 2017. After breaking into the world top 100 in 1997, and reaching a career-high singles ranking of world No. 2 in May 2002, his career was interrupted by injuries: Haas twice dropped out of the world rankings due to being unable to play for twelve months. His first period of injury saw him miss the whole of the 2003 season, and he did not return to the world's top 10 until 2007. He also missed over a year's tennis between February 2010 and June 2011, but afterwards returned to play on the tour. He returned to world No. 11 in 2013, after reaching the quarterfinals at the French Open for the first time in his career. Haas reached the semifinals of the Australian Open three times, and in Wimbledon once. He reached the quarterfinal stage of each of the Grand Slam events. He won 15 career titles in singles, including one Masters tournament (Stuttgart) in 2001, and has a silver medal from the 2000 Summer Olympics.

Early life
Born in Hamburg, Germany to Brigitte and Peter Haas, Tommy started playing his own version of tennis when he was four years old, using a wooden plank to hit balls against the wall or into his father's hands. When his father observed his talents, he started bringing Haas to work, as he was a tennis coach.

At five, Haas won his first youth tournament, in Hamburg. At eight, he won his second, in Munich. Between 11 and 13, Haas twice won the Austrian Championship, the German Championship, and the European Championship.

Haas's talents were noted by tennis guru Nick Bollettieri. He was so impressed by the young German's talent that he offered Haas the chance to stay and train at his Bollettieri Academy in Bradenton, Florida, for free, and Haas began attending at age 11. At 13, speaking little English, Haas moved full-time to Florida to train at the academy.

Tennis career

Juniors
As a junior Haas reached as high as No. 11 in the junior world singles rankings in 1995 (and No. 5 in doubles).

1996–2000: World Team Cup champion, first title, Grand Slam Cup final, Olympic Silver
In 1996, Haas became a professional tennis player. He played his first Grand Slam tournament at the US Open, losing in the first round to compatriot Michael Stich in four sets. He gained attention as a future star when he won his first ATP title in 1999, made it to the semifinals of the Australian Open, and was a finalist in the Grand Slam Cup. The following year, he won a silver medal at the Sydney Olympics defeating Wayne Ferreira, Andreas Vinciguerra, Àlex Corretja, Max Mirnyi and Roger Federer en route to the gold medal match where he lost to Yevgeny Kafelnikov. He also beat Andre Agassi at the 1998 Wimbledon Championships in the second round.

2001–2005: World No. 2, Masters champion, second World Team Cup victory and injuries

In 2001, he won four ATP titles, including his first Masters shield, finishing 2001 as world No. 8 and only missing out on playing in the season-ending Masters Cup because of Goran Ivanišević's Wimbledon victory, which meant Ivanišević took the eighth and final spot.  In the 2002 Australian Open, he won in five sets against Todd Martin and Roger Federer, and in four against Marcelo Ríos to reach the semifinals. He led Marat Safin two sets to one but suffered from a stiff shoulder after a rain delay, and Safin won the match, taking the final two sets 6–0, 6–2. Haas was quickly rising to the top of the tennis ranks when his career was suddenly halted at No. 2 in the world by a severe accident that nearly claimed the lives of his parents, leaving his father in a coma. Haas spent much of 2002 taking care of his family. At the end of this lay-off, he injured his shoulder, requiring a major operation. He was plagued by further injuries and related complications afterwards and did not return to professional tennis fully until 2004. Before his parents' accident and his injuries, he had a winning record against several former and future No. 1 ranked players: 3–0 against Andy Roddick, 2–1 against Roger Federer, 2–1 against Marat Safin, and 2–0 against Jim Courier, as well as 5–5 against Pete Sampras. Haas won two more ATP titles in his return year of 2004, while trying to gain back his form.

2006: Three titles, second US Open quarterfinal

In 2006, Haas won three ATP Tournaments and reached the quarterfinals at the US Open, where he was knocked out by Nikolay Davydenko after having been up two sets. Haas began having severe cramps in his legs in the third set. During the match he was visibly disturbed, repeatedly hitting his legs with his racquet, frustrated at the cramps.

At the end of the year, he had to win the Paris Masters to qualify for the Masters Cup, the ATP year-end final. He lost after a semifinal run to Dominik Hrbatý with health problems and did not play again for the rest of the year.

2007: Australian Open and Davis Cup semifinals, back to top 10
In 2007, Haas, with his long hair now cut short, had battled his way to his third Australian Open semifinal, which included matches against David Nalbandian and a five-set quarterfinal rematch against Nikolay Davydenko. He lost his semifinal match against first-time Grand Slam finalist Fernando González from Chile in straight sets. Despite this loss, Haas returned to the top 10 of the world rankings for the first time since 2002.

On 25 February, at the Regions Morgan Keegan Championships in Memphis, Haas stopped Andy Roddick's quest for the final, winning in two sets. This was the first time Haas had won a title without facing a single break point in any of his matches, as well as the first time he had won titles in consecutive seasons. Haas also became only the second player to win three titles at Memphis, the other being Jimmy Connors, who won in 1979, 1983, and 1984.

Haas reached the quarterfinals of the Pacific Life Open, an ATP Masters Series tournament held in Indian Wells, California, where he lost to Andy Murray in a third-set tiebreaker. In the 2007 ATP Champion's Race, Haas, the 13th seed (10th-ranked), not known for being much of a grass court player, advanced to the fourth round at Wimbledon for the first time, defeating Zack Fleishman, Tomáš Zíb, and No. 21 seed Dmitry Tursunov. His run came to an end after he suffered a torn abdominal muscle and had to withdraw a day before playing Roger Federer.

At the US Open, Haas equaled his best result in New York by reaching the quarterfinals with five-set wins over Sébastien Grosjean and James Blake. He beat Blake in a fifth-set tiebreak, saving match points. His run ended, however, with a three-set loss to Nikolay Davydenko.

2008–2009: Injuries, Wimbledon semifinal, return to top 20
In the first half of 2008, Haas was derailed by injuries, causing him to miss both the Australian Open and the French Open. This dropped him significantly in the rankings, as he was unable to back up his semifinal performance at the Australian Open the year before. He made it to the quarterfinals of the Pacific Life Open in Indian Wells, defeating Andy Murray in three sets. He was then forced to withdraw from his quarterfinal match against Roger Federer due to injury.

He reached the third round at Wimbledon with a four-set win over Guillermo Cañas and a straight-set win over 23rd seed Tommy Robredo. He then fell to Andy Murray in four sets.

In the hard-court season, he got to the semifinals of the Legg Mason Tennis Classic in Washington, D.C., but lost to Juan Martín del Potro. At the Rogers Cup in Toronto, he beat former world No. 1 Carlos Moyà, and then lost to Nikolay Davydenko in the second round. At the US Open, he beat 12th seed Richard Gasquet in five sets. He then fell to Gilles Müller of Luxembourg in five sets, despite cruising in the first two sets.

At the beginning of the new season, Haas pulled out of the Qatar ExxonMobil Open due to elbow problems. However, he appeared in the Kooyong Exhibition game, where he beat Mardy Fish.

At the 2009 Australian Open, Haas beat Eduardo Schwank in the first round and Flavio Cipolla in the second. In the third round, he fell to the tournament's first seed and eventual champion Rafael Nadal.

At the SAP Open in San Jose, California, he joined forces with Czech Radek Štěpánek to clinch his first doubles title, after losing in the singles quarterfinals to defending champion Andy Roddick.

Haas lost in the first round in both Memphis and Delray Beach. He did not succeed in defending his quarterfinal points at the BNP Paribas Open in Indian Wells, as he fell to Novak Djokovic in the third round, after defeating Óscar Hernández and Rainer Schüttler. He suffered another failure in the Miami Masters, losing to Mikhail Kukushkin.

In Houston, Texas, at the River Oaks Men's Clay Championship, Haas was defeated by Björn Phau in the quarterfinals, after he defeated defending champion Marcel Granollers in the second round.

As a qualifier in Madrid, he defeated Ernests Gulbis, before losing to Andy Roddick.

At the French Open, Haas matched his best result since 2002. He defeated Andrei Pavel in straight sets, and then won a five-setter against Leonardo Mayer. After defeating Jérémy Chardy in the third round, Haas was narrowly defeated by the former world No. 1 and eventual champion, Roger Federer, in the fourth round. At a crucial stage in the third set, Haas was only five points away from his biggest win on clay, but was unable to convert a break point that would have seen him serve for the match at 5–3. Federer hit a vital winner to level the score at 4–4, en route to a comeback victory 6–7(4), 5–7, 6–4, 6–0, 6–2.

At the Gerry Weber Open, Haas won his first title on grass in his 21st ATP World Tour final. In the process, he defeated fourth seed Jo-Wilfried Tsonga in the second round, Mischa Zverev in the quarterfinals, and Philipp Kohlschreiber in the semifinals. He defeated the tournament's second seed Novak Djokovic, in the final.

This victory made Haas one of a small group of players to have won ATP titles on all three major surfaces (grass, clay, and hard courts.) With Haas' success at this tournament and at the French Open, his ranking rose to no. 35.

At Wimbledon, Haas won a five-set match against Marin Čilić. Haas was up two sets to love and had match points in the fourth set, then had to save two match points serving at 5–6 before the match was suspended due to darkness after over four hours of play, at 6–6 in the fifth. The next day, Haas broke Cilic at 8–8 and eventually held on to win. Haas then comfortably defeated Igor Andreev to reach the quarterfinals. There, he defeated Novak Djokovic for the second time in three weeks to reach the semifinals at Wimbledon for the first time in his career, where he faced Roger Federer in a rematch of their encounter in Paris. Haas lost, ensuring Federer's historic seventh Wimbledon final. This success at Wimbledon made Haas rise considerably in ATP ranking, reaching No. 19.

Haas continued his late career resurgence by making it to the semifinals at the LA Tennis Open, defeating Marat Safin in the quarterfinals, before losing to Sam Querrey. He made it to the third round at the US Open, losing narrowly to Fernando Verdasco, after being up a break in each set.

2010–2011: Continued injuries and absence 
Following his comeback, however, Haas suffered from another bout of injury. He made the third round of the 2010 Australian Open, defeating Simon Greul and Janko Tipsarević, but did not play after February 2010, spending time recovering from right hip and right shoulder surgeries. He missed the rest of the 2010 season and once more dropped out of the ATP rankings. He returned to action partnering Radek Štěpánek in doubles in Munich in May 2011, but then lost in the first round. His return match in singles came at the 2011 French Open, where he lost in round one. He also went down in the first round at Wimbledon, but reached the third round of the US Open, losing to Juan Mónaco in four sets. Other than Grand Slams, he played little tennis, competing in only ten other tournaments, mainly in July, August, and October.

2012: 13th title, second ATP Comeback Player of the Year award

Haas began the 2012 season at the Brisbane International, but had to withdraw in the second round. Nevertheless, he competed more regularly in 2012 than in previous seasons. He qualified for the French Open, progressing to the third round, and reached the semifinals of the BMW Open, returning to the world's top 100.

As a wildcard at the Gerry Weber Open in Germany, Haas won the title for the second time thanks to wins over former champions Tomáš Berdych and Philipp Kohlschreiber en route to the final, where he defeated world No. 3 and five-time champion Federer in two sets. However, Haas was subsequently defeated in the first round of Wimbledon later that month, letting a two-sets-to-one lead slip against compatriot Philipp Kohlschreiber.

Haas lost to world No. 206, Pavol Červenák in the Stuttgart clay-court tournament at the second-round stage.

Haas continued to find good form during the second half of the season. He reached the finals of the German Open Tennis Championships 2012, losing to Juan Mónaco, and the Citi Open, losing to Alexandr Dolgopolov. These two runs saw Haas rise back into the top 50. Haas went on to reach two quarterfinals in Masters 1000 tournaments, his best performance at that level since 2008. Haas briefly returned to the top 20 in the world in October 2012, and he finished the season ranked No. 21. This was enough to earn him the Comeback Player of the Year award for a second time.

2013: French Open quarterfinal, victory over No.1, comeback to No.11 
Haas lost in the Australian Open first round. In February at the SAP Open he reached his 25th career final against defending champion Milos Raonic, but lost in straight sets. Next he played in Delray Beach International Tennis Championships as a former 2006 champion, where he lost to Ernests Gulbis in three sets in the semifinals.

At Indian Wells, he lost in the fourth round to Juan Martín del Potro after saving match point to beat Nicolás Almagro in the previous round. In Miami, he beat world No. 1, Novak Djokovic, in straight sets. It was his first victory over a top-ranked player since he defeated Andre Agassi in 1999. He followed this up with a victory over Gilles Simon to reach his first Miami semifinal, and first Masters 1000 semifinal since the 2006 Paris Masters. There, he lost to third seed David Ferrer, 6–4, 2–6, 3–6.

In May, he won his first title of the year at Munich, beating Philipp Kohlschreiber in an all-German final.

Haas made history at the French Open, when he missed a record twelve match points against John Isner in the fourth set of their third round match. Isner won the set on a tiebreak, but in the fifth set Haas went on to recover from 2–4 down and saved a match point against him at 4–5 to eventually win 10–8. Haas beat Mikhail Youzhny in the fourth round but eventually lost to Djokovic in straight sets in the quarter finals.

At Wimbledon, Haas advanced to the fourth round to set up a rematch against Djokovic but again lost in straight sets.

2014–2018: Last career final, Indian Wells Tournament Director, retirement

2014

Haas started the season at the Heineken Open in Auckland, where he lost in the second round against Jack Sock in straight sets.  At the Australian Open, he was forced to retire with a recurring shoulder problem against Guillermo García López in the first round after trailing 5–7, 2–5 on serve.  After the setback, he participated in the first round of the Davis Cup against Spain. He teamed up alongside Philipp Kohlschreiber in doubles, taking a four-set victory to hand Germany a place in the quarterfinals for the first time since 2011.

Haas then hired compatriot Alexander Waske as his new coach. His goal was to qualify for his first season-end ATP World Tour Finals. In his next tournament, the Zagreb Indoors, Haas reached the final by defeating Benjamin Becker, Andrey Kuznetsov, and Daniel Evans. In the final, he was beaten by defending champion Marin Čilić in straight sets.

At the 2014 BMW Open, Haas was the defending champion. He made it to the semifinals, but lost to Martin Kližan. Haas reached the fourth round of the BNP Paribas Open, where he was defeated by Roger Federer in straight sets. Haas reached the quarterfinals of the Rome Masters after beating third seed Stan Wawrinka. He then retired in the quarterfinals to Grigor Dimitrov.

Haas missed the rest of the 2014 season to have an operation on his injured right shoulder which had forced him to retire from several events.

2015
After a later than expected return from injury, in the grass court season in June 2015, Haas played his comeback match at Stuttgart as a wild card. In the first round he beat Mikhail Kukushkin in straight sets but then lost to Bernard Tomic in straight sets in the second round. Haas then played at the Gerry Weber Open, losing in the first round to eventual finalist Andreas Seppi. His next tournament was Wimbledon, where he reached the second round. After beating Dušan Lajović, he lost to world No. 8 Milos Raonic in four sets.. At the US Open, Haas was defeated by Fernando Verdasco in a five-setter in the first round.

2016
In April 2016, Haas, at 38, had toe surgery and was out for nine months, "I know that there's a chance that I might not come back from this", Haas said. "I know it will be a very, very hard task, but there's no doubt in my mind I'm certainly going to try."

In June 2016, Tommy Haas was named the new Indian Wells Tournament Director. "I'm thrilled to join the BNP Paribas Open as its new Tournament Director and look forward to working with one of the finest sporting events in the world", said Haas. "There is a reason that the BNP Paribas Open has been voted Tournament of the Year by both tours for consecutive years, as the tournament and venue continue to provide a world-class experience for players, fans and sponsors. I look forward to joining the experienced Indian Wells staff, building upon the foundation they have created, and working to take the event to even greater heights."

2017
In January 2017, Haas made his first ATP Tour appearance in 15 months at the Australian Open. In the first round, he retired after the second set because he felt physically "empty".

In April 2017, Haas won his first match at ATP-level in 21 months in Houston. At the age of 39, he defeated the almost 20 years younger Reilly Opelka in the first round. This victory made him the oldest player to win an ATP Tour match since Jimmy Connors in 1995. He then lost to top seed Jack Sock in three sets.

At the Monte-Carlo Masters, Haas beat world No. 40 Benoît Paire in straight sets in the first round. In the second round, he lost to Tomáš Berdych in a close match.

In June, Haas reached the quarterfinals of the MercedesCup in Stuttgart after upsetting Roger Federer in the second round and Pierre-Hugues Herbert in the first round. In the quarterfinals, he lost to sixth seed Mischa Zverev in straight sets.

Haas played his last ATP tournament in Kitzbühel in August 2017, where he lost in the first round to compatriot Jan-Lennard Struff. He was not given a wild card for the US Open and cancelled his participation at the Vienna Open.

2018
At the 2018 Australian Open, Haas coached Lucas Pouille.

In February, it was assumed that Haas ended his career because of an interview he gave a California newspaper. On 15 March 2018, he officially announced his retirement from the ATP World Tour.

Performance timelines

Singles

* 2007 Wimbledon counts as 3 wins, 0 losses. Roger Federer walkover in round 4, after Haas withdrew because of a torn stomach muscle, does not count as a Haas loss.

1Held as Hamburg Masters until 2008, Madrid Masters (outdoor clay) 2009 – present.
2Held as Stuttgart Masters until 2001, Madrid Masters (indoor hard) from 2002 to 2008, and Shanghai Masters 2009 – present.

Doubles

1Held as Hamburg Masters until 2008, Madrid Masters (outdoor clay) 2009 – present.
2Held as Stuttgart Masters until 2001, Madrid Masters (indoor hard) from 2002 to 2008, and Shanghai Masters 2009 – present.

Post-retirement activity
In July 2020, Haas played the Berlin tennis exhibitions, where he beat Jan-Lennard Struff before he lost to Dominic Thiem.

Playing style
Haas was an all-court player, capable of playing well on clay, hard, and grass surfaces. Nick Bollettieri noted Haas as having "one of the greatest backhands in the world", praising its versatility and power. Haas also possessed a powerful slice backhand, which he used to disrupt the rhythm of the point and to construct offensive positions. He also possessed a strong serve and a functional set of volleys.

Haas was known for his refined footwork and racquet skills, both of which he used to construct quick defensive-to-offensive transitions. He was widely considered one of the best players to have never won a grand slam, having been restricted by numerous injuries. Reviewers described him as having nice "fluidity" and how his game overall allows him to adapt to most situations, as demonstrated by his equal win percentage over both right and left-handed players, as well as his relatively even win percentages on all surfaces. Haas' mental game was described as solid, boasting a positive win record in deciding sets (3rd or 5th).

Personal life
On 27 January 2010, Haas became a United States citizen, but continued to represent Germany in tennis.

Since 2010, Haas has been engaged to actress Sara Foster. They have two daughters together, Valentina and Josephine. Haas is the son-in-law of David Foster.

Significant finals

Olympic finals

Singles: 1 (1 silver medal)

Grand Slam Cup finals

Singles: 1 (0–1)

Masters Series finals

Singles: 2 (1–1)

ATP career finals

Singles: 28 (15–13)

Doubles: 1 (1–0)

Team competition: 2 (2–0)

ATP Challenger finals

Singles: 3 (0–3)

Record against other players

Record against top-10 players
Haas' record against players who have been ranked world No. 10 or higher.

Record against No. 11–20 players
Haas' record against players who have been ranked world No. 11–20.

 Vincent Spadea 9–2
 Xavier Malisse 9–4
 Max Mirnyi 8–1
 Andrei Pavel 8–4
 Dominik Hrbatý 8–6
 Fabrice Santoro 6–3
 Florian Mayer 5–0
 Dmitry Tursunov 5–1
 Sjeng Schalken 4–1
 Robby Ginepri 4–2
 Sam Querrey 4–2
 Andreas Seppi 4–2
 Feliciano López 3–0
 Marcel Granollers 3–1
 Jarkko Nieminen 3–1
 Philipp Kohlschreiber 3–4
 Stefan Koubek 2–0
 Jason Stoltenberg 2–0
 Igor Andreev 2–1
 Juan Ignacio Chela 2–2
 Ivo Karlović 2–4
 Arnaud Boetsch 1–0
 Renzo Furlan 1–0
 Jan-Michael Gambill 1–0
 Reilly Opelka 1–0
 Albert Portas 1–0
 Francisco Clavet 1–1
 Alexandr Dolgopolov 1–1
 Nicolas Escudé 1–1
 Andrea Gaudenzi 1–1
 Benoît Paire 1–1
 Mark Woodforde 1–1
 Paul-Henri Mathieu 1–2
 Bernard Tomic 1–3
 Nikoloz Basilashvili 0–1
 Younes El Aynaoui 0–1
 Jerzy Janowicz 0–1
 Jan Siemerink 0–1
 Franco Squillari 0–2

Wins over top 10 players
Haas has a  record against players who were, at the time the match was played, ranked in the top 10.

German tournaments

References

External links

 
 
 
 

1978 births
Living people
German emigrants to the United States
German male tennis players
Hopman Cup competitors
Olympic medalists in tennis
Olympic silver medalists for Germany
Olympic tennis players of Germany
Sportspeople from Sarasota, Florida
Tennis players from Hamburg
Tennis people from Florida
Tennis players at the 2000 Summer Olympics
Tennis players at the 2004 Summer Olympics
Medalists at the 2000 Summer Olympics
People with acquired American citizenship